Fissurella is a genus of small to medium-sized sea snails or limpets, marine gastropod mollusks in the subfamily Fissurellinae of the family Fissurellidae, the keyhole limpets.

Description
The size of the body does not exceed or marginally exceeds that of the shell. The outer radular plate has four cusps. The propodium (= the anterior end of the foot) has no tentacles.

Ecology 
Like all other fissurellids, Fissurella species are herbivores, using the radula to scrape up algae from the surface of rocks.

Water for respiration and excretion is drawn in under the edge of the shell and exits through the "keyhole" at the apex.

Species
According to the World Register of Marine Species (WoRMS), the following species with accepted names are included within the genus Fissurella 

 Fissurella afra Quoy & Gaimard, 1834
 Fissurella alabastrites Reeve, 1849
 † Fissurella altior Meyer & Aldrich, 1896
 Fissurella angusta (Gmelin, 1791)
 † Fissurella apicifera Lozouet, 1999 
 Fissurella asperella Sowerby, 1835 West America
 Fissurella barbadensis (Gmelin, 1791)
 Fissurella barbouri Pérez Farfante, 1943
 Fissurella bravensis F. Salvat, 1967
 Fissurella bridgesii Reeve, 1849
 Fissurella clenchi Pérez Farfante, 1943
 Fissurella coarctata King & Broderip, 1831
 Fissurella costaria Deshayes, 1824
 Fissurella costata Lesson, 1830 Southwest America
 Fissurella crassa Lamarck, 1822 Arctic
 Fissurella cumingi Reeve, 1849 Chile
 Fissurella cyathulum Reeve, 1850
 Fissurella decemcostata F. S. Mclean, 1970 West America
 Fissurella deroyae F. S. Mclean, 1970 West America
 Fissurella emmanuelae Métivier, 1970
 Fissurella fascicularis Lamarck, 1822
 Fissurella fischeri F. Salvat, 1967
 Fissurella formosa F. Salvat, 1967
 Fissurella gaillardi F. Salvat, 1967
 Fissurella gemmata Menke. , 1847 West America
 Fissurella hendrickxi Suárez-Mozo & Geiger, 2017
 Fissurella latimarginata Sowerby, 1835 Chile
 Fissurella limbata Sowerby I, 1835 Chile
 Fissurella longifissa Sowerby, 1862
 Fissurella macrotrema Sowerby, 1835 West America 
 Fissurella maxima Sowerby I, 1835 West America
 Fissurella mesoatlantica Simone, 2008
 Fissurella microtrema Sowerby, 1835
 Fissurella morrisoni F. S. Mclean, 1970 West America
 Fissurella mutabilis Sowerby I, 1835
 Fissurella natalensis Krauss, 1848
 Fissurella nigra Lesson, 1831
 Fissurella nigrocincta Carpenter, 1856 West America
 Fissurella nimbosa (Linnaeus, 1758)
 Fissurella nodosa (Born, 1778)
 Fissurella nubecula (Linnaeus, 1758)
 Fissurella obscura Sowerby I, 1835 West America
 Fissurella oriens Sowerby I, 1835
 Fissurella peruviana Lamarck, 1822 Southeast Pacific
 Fissurella peruviana occidens A. A. Gould , Southeast Pacific
 Fissurella picta (Gmelin, 1791)
 Fissurella pulchra Sowerby I, 1834
 Fissurella punctata Pérez Farfante, 1943
 Fissurella radiosa Lesson, 1831
 Fissurella radiosa radiosa Lesson, 1831
 Fissurella radiosa tixierae Métivier, 1969
 † Fissurella rixfordi Hertlein, 1928 
 † Fissurella robusta Sowerby III, 1889
 Fissurella rosea (Gmelin, 1791)
 Fissurella rubropicta Pilsbry, 1890 West America
 Fissurella salvatiana Christiaens, 1982
 Fissurella savignyi Pallary, 1926
 Fissurella schrammii Fischer, 1857
 Fissurella spongiosa Carpenter, 1857 West America
 † Fissurella stantoni C. L. Powell & Geiger, 2019 
 Fissurella subrostrata Sowerby I, 1835
 Fissurella vaillanti P. Fischer, 1865
 Fissurella verna Gould, 1846
 Fissurella virescens Sowerby I, 1835 West America
 Fissurella volcano Reeve, 1849

The Indo-Pacific Molluscan Database adds the following species to the list 
 Fissurella delicata Smith, 1899
 Fissurella excelsa Adams & Reeve, 1850
 Fissurella sibogae Schepman, 1908

The following species are also mentioned by Schooner specimen shells. This list may contain synonyms.
 Fissurella gemmulata L. A. Reeve, 1850 Puerto Rico
 Fissurella glaucopsis L. A. Reeve, 1850 Cape Verde
 Fissurella humphreysi L. A. Reeve, 1850 Cape Verde
 Fissurella nodosa crusoe Pérez Farfante, Trinidad
Species brought into synonymy

 Fissurella aequalis G.B. Sowerby I, 1835: synonym of Lucapinella aequalis (G.B. Sowerby I, 1835)
 Fissurella affinis Gray in G.B. Sowerby I, 1835: synonym of Fissurella peruviana Lamarck, 1822
 Fissurella alba Philippi, 1845: synonym of Fissurella oriens G.B. Sowerby I, 1834
 Fissurella alboradiata Turton, 1932: synonym of Fissurella mutabilis G. B. Sowerby I, 1835
 Fissurella alta C. B. Adams, 1852: synonym of Diodora alta (C. B. Adams, 1852)
 Fissurella alternata Say, 1822: synonym of Diodora cayenensis (Lamarck, 1822)
 Fissurella aperta G.B. Sowerby I, 1825: synonym of Pupillaea aperta (Sowerby I, 1825)
 Fissurella arcuata G. B. Sowerby II, 1862: synonym of Diodora arcuata (G. B. Sowerby II, 1862)
 Fissurella arenicola Rochebrune & Mabille, 1885: synonym of Fissurella oriens G.B. Sowerby I, 1834
 Fissurella aspera Rathke, 1833: synonym of Diodora aspera (Rathke, 1833)
 Fissurella atrata Reeve, 1850: synonym of Fissurella picta (Gmelin, 1791)
 Fissurella australis Philippi, 1845: synonym of Fissurella oriens G.B. Sowerby I, 1834
 Fissurella australis Krauss, 1848: synonym of Diodora kraussi Herbert & Warén, 1999
 Fissurella bella Reeve, 1849: synonym of Fissurella latimarginata G.B. Sowerby I, 1835
 Fissurella biradiata G.B. Sowerby I, 1835: synonym of Fissurella latimarginata G.B. Sowerby I, 1835
 Fissurella bombayana G. B. Sowerby II, 1862: synonym of Diodora singaporensis (Reeve, 1850)
 Fissurella calyculata G. B. Sowerby I, 1823: synonym of Diodora calyculata (G. B. Sowerby I, 1823)
 Fissurella canalifera G. Nevill & H. Nevill, 1869: synonym of Lucapinella canalifera (G. Nevill & H. Nevill, 1869)
 Fissurella candida G. B. Sowerby I, 1835: synonym of Diodora candida (G. B. Sowerby I, 1835)
 Fissurella cayenensis Lamarck, 1822: synonym of Diodora cayenensis (Lamarck, 1822)
 Fissurella chemnitzii G. B. Sowerby I, 1835: synonym of Medusafissurella chemnitzii (G. B. Sowerby I, 1835)
 Fissurella cheullina Ramirez-Boehme, 1974: synonym of Fissurella oriens G.B. Sowerby I, 1834
 Fissurella chilensis G.B. Sowerby I, 1835: synonym of Fissurella costata Lesson, 1831
 Fissurella cinnabrina Costa O.G., 1839: synonym of Fissurella nubecula (Linnaeus, 1758)
 Fissurella clathrata Reeve, 1849: synonym of Diodora clathrata (Reeve, 1849)
 Fissurella clypeiformis G.B. Sowerby I, 1825: synonym of Fissurella crassa Lamarck, 1822
 Fissurella clypeus G.B. Sowerby I, 1835: synonym of Fissurella peruviana Lamarck, 1822
 Fissurella compressa Thiele, 1930: synonym of Amblychilepas compressa (Thiele, 1930)
 Fissurella concatenata Crosse & P. Fischer, 1864: synonym of Cosmetalepas concatenata (Crosse & P. Fischer, 1864)
 Fissurella concinna Philippi, 1845: synonym of Fissurella maxima G.B. Sowerby I, 1834
 Fissurella corbicula Sowerby, 1862: synonym of Diodora corbicula (Sowerby, 1862)
 Fissurella corrugata Costa O.G., 1839: synonym of Diodora graeca (Linnaeus, 1758)
 Fissurella cruciata Gould, 1846: synonym of Diodora cruciata (Gould, 1846)
 Fissurella cruciata Krauss, 1848: synonym of Diodora cruciata (Gould, 1846)
 Fissurella darwinii Reeve, 1849: synonym of Fissurella radiosa Lesson, 1831
 Fissurella depressa Lamarck, 1822: synonym of Fissurella crassa Lamarck, 1822
 Fissurella digueti Mabille, 1895: synonym of Diodora digueti (Mabille, 1895)
 Fissurella doellojuradoi Perez-Farfante, 1952: synonym of Fissurella oriens G.B. Sowerby I, 1834
 Fissurella dominicana Costa O.G., 1839: synonym of Diodora graeca (Linnaeus, 1758)
 Fissurella dorsata Monterosato, 1878: synonym of Diodora dorsata (Monterosato, 1878)
 Fissurella dozei Rochebrune & Mabille, 1885: synonym of Fissurella radiosa Lesson, 1831
 Fissurella dubia Reeve, 1849: synonym of Amblychilepas dubia (Reeve, 1849)
 Fissurella elevata Dunker, 1846: synonym of Diodora elevata (Dunker, 1846)
 Fissurella exquisita Reeve, 1850: synonym of Fissurella radiosa Lesson, 1831
 Fissurella flavida Philippi, 1857: synonym of Fissurella oriens G.B. Sowerby I, 1834
 Fissurella fluviana Dall, 1889: synonym of Diodora fluviana (Dall, 1889)
 Fissurella fontainiana d'Orbigny, 1841: synonym of Diodora fontainiana (d'Orbigny, 1841)
 Fissurella foresti F. Salvat, 1967: synonym of Fissurella salvatiana Christiaens, 1974
 Fissurella fulvescens G.B. Sowerby I, 1835: synonym of Fissurella oriens G.B. Sowerby I, 1834
 Fissurella fumata Reeve, 1850: synonym of Diodora cayenensis (Lamarck, 1822)
 Fissurella funiculata Reeve, 1850: synonym of Diodora funiculata (Reeve, 1850)
 Fissurella galericulum Reeve, 1850: synonym of Fissurella latimarginata G.B. Sowerby I, 1835
 Fissurella gibba Philippi, 1836: synonym of Diodora gibberula (Lamarck, 1822)
 Fissurella gibberula Lamarck, 1822: synonym of Diodora gibberula (Lamarck, 1822)
 Fissurella graeca (Linnaeus, 1758): synonym of Diodora graeca (Linnaeus, 1758)
 Fissurella grandis G.B. Sowerby I, 1835: synonym of Fissurella nigra Lesson, 1831
 Fissurella granifera Pease, 1861: synonym of Diodora granifera (Pease, 1861)
 Fissurella grisea Reeve, 1849: synonym of Fissurella radiosa Lesson, 1831
 Fissurella hedeia Rochebrune & Mabille, 1885: synonym of Fissurella oriens G.B. Sowerby I, 1834
 Fissurella henseli Martens, 1900: synonym of Lucapinella henseli (Martens, 1900)
 Fissurella hiantula Lamarck, 1822: synonym of Dendrofissurella scutellum hiantula (Lamarck, 1822)
 Fissurella hondurasensis Reeve, 1849: synonym of Fissurella maxima G.B. Sowerby I, 1834
 Fissurella huttoni Suter, 1906: synonym of Fissurella rosea (Gmelin, 1791)
 Fissurella inaequalis G. B. Sowerby I, 1835: synonym of Diodora inaequalis (G. B. Sowerby I, 1835)
 Fissurella incarnata Krauss, 1848: synonym of Dendrofissurella scutellum hiantula (Lamarck, 1822)
 Fissurella incii Reeve, 1850: synonym of Diodora lineata (G.B. Sowerby I, 1835)
 Fissurella indistincta Turton, 1932: synonym of Fissurella natalensis Krauss, 1848
 Fissurella indusica Reeve, 1850: synonym of Diodora funiculata (Reeve, 1850)
 Fissurella italica Defrance, 1820: synonym of Diodora italica (Defrance, 1820)
 Fissurella javanicensis Lamarck, 1822: synonym of Amblychilepas javanicensis (Lamarck, 1822)
 Fissurella jukesii Reeve, 1850: synonym of Diodora jukesii (Reeve, 1850)
 Fissurella lanceolata Sowerby, 1862: synonym of Diodora corbicula (Sowerby, 1862)
 Fissurella larva Reeve, 1850: synonym of Diodora cayenensis (Lamarck, 1822)
 Fissurella lata G.B. Sowerby I, 1835: synonym of Fissurella picta (Gmelin, 1791)
 Fissurella lentiginosa Reeve, 1850: synonym of Diodora lentiginosa (Reeve, 1850)
 Fissurella lilacina Costa O.G., 1839: synonym of Fissurella nubecula (Linnaeus, 1758)
 Fissurella lima G.B Sowerby II, 1862: synonym of Diodora lima (G.B. Sowerby II, 1862)
 Fissurella lineata G.B. Sowerby I, 1835: synonym of Diodora lineata (G.B. Sowerby I, 1835)
 Fissurella mamillata Risso, 1826: synonym of Diodora graeca (Linnaeus, 1758)
 Fissurella mediterranea Gray J.E. in Sowerby G.B. I, 1835: synonym of Diodora italica (Defrance, 1820)
 Fissurella melvilli G. B. Sowerby III, 1882: synonym of Medusafissurella melvilli (G. B. Sowerby III, 1882)
 Fissurella menkeana Dunker, 1846: synonym of Diodora menkeana (Dunker, 1846)
 Fissurella mexicana G.B. Sowerby I, 1835: synonym of Fissurella oriens G.B. Sowerby I, 1834
 Fissurella miranda de Gregorio, 1885: synonym of Diodora graeca (Linnaeus, 1758)
 Fissurella miriga de Gregorio, 1885: synonym of Diodora dorsata (Monterosato, 1878)
 Fissurella mondelloensis de Gregorio, 1885: synonym of Fissurella nubecula (Linnaeus, 1758)
 Fissurella muricata Reeve, 1850: synonym of Fissurella picta (Gmelin, 1791)
 Fissurella navicula Turton, 1932: synonym of Fissurella mutabilis G. B. Sowerby I, 1835
 Fissurella navidensis Ramirez-Boehme, 1974: synonym of Fissurella picta (Gmelin, 1791)
 Fissurella neglecta Deshayes, 1830: synonym of Diodora italica (Defrance, 1820)
 Fissurella nigra Philippi, 1845: synonym of Fissurella radiosa Lesson, 1831
 Fissurella nigriadiata Reeve, 1850: synonym of Diodora ruppellii (G. B. Sowerby I, 1835)
 Fissurella nigrita G. B. Sowerby I, 1835: synonym of Amblychilepas nigrita (G. B. Sowerby I, 1835)
 Fissurella oblonga Ramirez-Boehme, 1974: synonym of Fissurella oriens G.B. Sowerby I, 1834
 Fissurella oblonga Menke, 1843: synonym of Amblychilepas oblonga (Menke, 1843)
 Fissurella occidens Gould, 1846: synonym of Fissurella peruviana Lamarck, 1822
 Fissurella occitanica Récluz, 1843: synonym of Diodora graeca (Linnaeus, 1758)
 Fissurella octagona Reeve, 1850: synonym of Diodora octagona (Reeve, 1850)
 Fissurella omicron Crosse & P. Fischer, 1864: synonym of Amblychilepas omicron (Crosse & P. Fischer, 1864)
 Fissurella panamensis G. B. Sowerby I, 1835: synonym of Diodora panamensis (G. B. Sowerby I, 1835)
 Fissurella papudana Ramirez-Boehme, 1974: synonym of Fissurella peruviana Lamarck, 1822
 Fissurella parviforata Sowerby III, 1889: synonym of Diodora parviforata (Sowerby III, 1889)
 Fissurella philippiana Reeve, 1850: synonym of Fissurella radiosa Lesson, 1831
 Fissurella philippiana Dunker, 1846: synonym of Diodora philippiana (Dunker, 1846)
 Fissurella philippii Hupé, 1854: synonym of Fissurella radiosa Lesson, 1831
 Fissurella philippii Requien, 1848: synonym of Fissurella nubecula (Linnaeus, 1758)
 Fissurella pica G. B. Sowerby I, 1835: synonym of Diodora pica (G. B. Sowerby I, 1835)
 Fissurella pileopsoides Reeve, 1850: synonym of Diodora pileopsoides (Reeve, 1850)
 Fissurella pluridenta Mabille, 1895: synonym of Diodora inaequalis (G. B. Sowerby I, 1835)
 Fissurella polygona G.B. Sowerby II, 1862: synonym of Fissurella radiosa Lesson, 1831
 Fissurella producta Monterosato, 1880: synonym of Diodora producta (Monterosato, 1880)
 Fissurella punctatissima Pilsbry, 1890: synonym of Fissurella latimarginata G.B. Sowerby I, 1835
 Fissurella quadriradiata Reeve, 1850: synonym of Diodora quadriradiata (Reeve, 1850)
 Fissurella radiola Deshayes, 1830: synonym of Fissurella picta (Gmelin, 1791)
 Fissurella recurvata Costa O.G., 1839: synonym of Diodora graeca (Linnaeus, 1758)
 Fissurella reticulata (Da Costa, 1778): synonym of Diodora graeca (Linnaeus, 1758)
 Fissurella reticulata Liénard, 1877: synonym of Diodora ruppellii (G. B. Sowerby I, 1835)
 Fissurella rota Reeve, 1850: synonym of Fissurella mutabilis G. B. Sowerby I, 1835
 Fissurella rubiginosa Hutton, 1873: synonym of Radiacmea inconspicua (Gray, 1843)
 Fissurella rudis Deshayes, 1830: synonym of Fissurella costata Lesson, 1831
 Fissurella ruppelli G.B. Sowerby I, 1835: synonym of Diodora rueppellii (G.B. Sowerby I, 1835)
 Fissurella sagittata Reeve, 1849: synonym of Fissurella mutabilis G. B. Sowerby I, 1835
 Fissurella saharica Locard, 1897: synonym of Diodora dorsata (Monterosato, 1878)
 Fissurella salebrosa Reeve, 1850: synonym of Medusafissurella salebrosa (Reeve, 1850)
 Fissurella sayi Dall, 1889: synonym of Diodora sayi (Dall, 1889)
 Fissurella sculpturata Turton, 1932: synonym of Diodora levicostata (E. A. Smith, 1914)
 Fissurella scutellum Gray in G. B. Sowerby, 1835: synonym of Amblychilepas javanicensis (Lamarck, 1822)
 Fissurella similis Sowerby, 1862: synonym of Diodora jukesii (Reeve, 1850)
 Fissurella singaporensis Reeve, 1850: synonym of Diodora singaporensis (Reeve, 1850)
 Fissurella solida Philippi, 1845: synonym of Fissurella maxima G.B. Sowerby I, 1834
 Fissurella squamosa Hutton, 1873: synonym of Fissurella rosea (Gmelin, 1791)
 Fissurella stellata Reeve, 1850: synonym of Fissurella cumingi Reeve, 1849
 Fissurella subrotunda Deshayes, 1830: synonym of Fissurella peruviana Lamarck, 1822
 Fissurella tanneri A. E. Verrill, 1882: synonym of Diodora tanneri (A. E. Verrill, 1882)
 Fissurella tarnieri [sic]: synonym of Fissurella tanneri A. E. Verrill, 1882: synonym of Diodora tanneri (A. E. Verrill, 1882)
 Fissurella tasmaniensis Bonnet, 1864: synonym of Amblychilepas javanicensis (Lamarck, 1822)
 Fissurella tenuistriata Sowerby, 1862: synonym of Diodora singaporensis (Reeve, 1850)
 Fissurella ticaonica Reeve, 1850: synonym of Diodora ticaonica (Reeve, 1850)
 Fissurella tixierae Métivier, 1969: synonym of Fissurella radiosa Lesson, 1831
 Fissurella townsendi Melvill, 1897: synonym of Diodora singaporensis (Reeve, 1850)
 Fissurella trapezina G. B. Sowerby I, 1835: synonym of Amblychilepas javanicensis (Lamarck, 1822)
 Fissurella variegata G.B. Sowerby II, 1862: synonym of Diodora variegata (G. B. Sowerby II, 1862)
 Fissurella viminea Reeve, 1850: synonym of Diodora cayenensis (Lamarck, 1822)
 Fissurella violacea Rathke, 1833: synonym of Fissurella nigra Lesson, 1831
 Fissurella viridis Costa O.G., 1839: synonym of Fissurella nubecula (Linnaeus, 1758)
 Fissurella vitoensis de Gregorio, 1885: synonym of Diodora italica (Defrance, 1820)

References

   McLean J.H. (1984) Systematics of Fissurella in the Peruvian and Magellanic faunal provinces (Gastropoda: Prosobranchia). Contributions in Science, Natural History Museum of Los Angeles County 354: 1-70. (29 October 1984)  
 Gofas, S.; Le Renard, J.; Bouchet, P. (2001). Mollusca, in: Costello, M.J. et al. (Ed.) (2001). European register of marine species: a check-list of the marine species in Europe and a bibliography of guides to their identification. Collection Patrimoines Naturels, 50: pp. 180–213

External links
 Many photos of fissurellid species

 

Fissurellidae